Expedition Robinson was the Central European version of Expedition Robinson. The name alludes to both Robinson Crusoe and The Swiss Family Robinson, two stories featuring people marooned by shipwrecks.

Background and history
In the spring of 2000, ORF in Austria and RTL2 in Germany decided to buy the broadcasting rights to the shows Big Brother and Expedition Robinson as they wanted to begin airing a new "reality soaps" genre. Neither show was quite as big a success as RTL2 had expected, however both were renewed for a second season (Big Brother would eventually be renewed for at least ten more). , an unofficial adaption of the format aired on Sat.1 in 2000 but was axed after one season.

Following the first season, ORF chose to no longer broadcast Expedition Robinson leaving only RTL2 to air a second season. Gestrandet proved to be a ratings failure and was also axed. This was followed by Outback, a unofficial adaption of Survivor: The Australian Outback, in 2002 on RTL and a ProSieben revival of Survivor in 2007. The format returned once more in 2019, this time on VOX.

Format
The Robinson format was developed by Planet 24, a United Kingdom TV production company owned by Charlie Parsons and Bob Geldof. Their company Castaway Television Productions retained the rights to the concept when they sold Planet 24 in 1999. Mark Burnett later licensed the format to create the U.S. show Survivor in 2000.

Sixteen contestants are put into a survival situation and compete in a variety of physical challenges. Early in each season two teams compete but later on the teams are merged and the competitions become individual. At the end of each show one contestant is eliminated from the show by the others in a secret "island council" ballot.

The format for Gestrandet was very similar to that of Robinson, but instead of there being sixteen contestants, there were only fourteen and they were initially divided into tribes by gender. Jokers could also enter the game at any time. Finally the winner of Gestrandet was not determined by any kind of juror vote, but was decided by a large obstacle course.

Seasons

References

External links
Expedition Robinson News

 
Survivor (franchise)
2000 German television series debuts
2000 German television series endings
German-language television shows
RTL Zwei original programming
ORF (broadcaster)
Reality television articles with incorrect naming style